Aaron Yates (born December 13, 1973, in Milledgeville, Georgia, United States) is an American motorcycle racer. He won the AMA 750 Supersport Championship in 1996, the AMA Supersport Championship in 2002 and the AMA Superstock Championship in 2005 and 2008.

Career statistics

Superbike World Championship

Races by year

Grand Prix motorcycle racing

By season

Races by year
(key)

References

External links 

Living people
1973 births
American motorcycle racers
Sportspeople from Columbus, Georgia
MotoGP World Championship riders
Superbike World Championship riders
AMA Superbike Championship riders